The Whirl of New York is a Broadway musical that premiered at Winter Garden Theatre on June 13, 1921. It was an expanded and substantially re-worked version of The Belle of New York (1897, music by Gustave Kerker with book and lyrics by Hugh Morton). The show was billed not as a revival but as "founded on The Belle of New York.".  The new version had music by Gustave Kerker, Al Goodman and Lew Pollack; book and lyrics by Hugh Morton and Edgar Smith; additional music by Leo Edwards; and additional lyrics by Sidney D Mitchell, Cyrus Wood and Cliff Friend. It opened to favourable reviews and ran for 124 performances.

Premiere cast
The premiere cast included:
John T. Murray (Ichabod Bronson) 
J. Harold Murray (Harry Bronson) 
Dorothy Ward (Cora Angélique)
Nancy Gibbs (Violet Gray)
Joe Keno (Blinky Bill McGuire) 
Rosie Green (Mamie Clancy)
Louis Mann (Karl Von Pumpernick)
Shaun Glenville (Doc Sniffkins)

References

Broadway musicals
1921 musicals